Anna-Elisabeth von Treuenfels-Frowein (née von der Decken; born 13 May 1962) is a German politician from the Free Democratic Party. She represents Blankenese in the Hamburg Parliament.

References 

Living people
1962 births
Free Democratic Party (Germany) politicians
21st-century German politicians
21st-century German women politicians

Members of the Hamburg Parliament